Qualifying rounds of  Men's 4 x 100 metre medley relay at the  1958 European Aquatics Championships  were held on 4th, final was on 6 September. 11 teams competed at the champion.

Soviet Union won the gold medal with a European record. Hungary finished at the 2nd, Italy at the 3rd place.

Records

Before the races

New records during the competition:

Results 
Here are the meanings of the abbreviations:

Qualifications

Final

Sources

1958 European Aquatics Championships